Arne Einarsson Vade (c. 1300 – after 17 October 1349) was a 14th-century Norwegian priest who served as Archbishop of Nidaros.

His parents were Einar and Ingebjørg Arnesdatter.

He served as archbishop of Nidaros from 1346 to 1349.

References

1300 births
1349 deaths
14th-century Roman Catholic archbishops in Norway
Year of birth uncertain